The Hideaways may refer to:

The Hideaways (band), beat group that flourished in Liverpool in the 1960s
The Hideaways, alternative title for the 1973 film From the Mixed-Up Files of Mrs. Basil E. Frankweiler

See also
Hideaways, a 2011 thriller fantasy film
Hideaway (disambiguation)